The 2022 Southeastern Conference women's basketball tournament was a postseason women's basketball tournament for the Southeastern Conference held at the Bridgestone Arena in Nashville, Tennessee, from March 2 through 6, 2022. The winner received an automatic bid to the 2022 NCAA Division I women's basketball tournament.
In the championship game, the seventh-seeded Kentucky Wildcats pulled off a major upset against the top-seeded and top-ranked South Carolina Gamecocks, 64–62.

Seeds

Schedule

Bracket 

* denotes overtime

See also 

 2022 SEC men's basketball tournament

References

2021–22 Southeastern Conference women's basketball season
SEC women's basketball tournament
SEC Women's Basketball
Basketball competitions in Nashville, Tennessee
Women's sports in Tennessee
College sports tournaments in Tennessee